The 2018–19 Boston College Eagles women's basketball team represents Boston College during the 2018–19 NCAA Division I women's basketball season. The Eagles, were led by first year head coach Joanna Bernabei-McNamee. They play their home games at the Conte Forum and were members of the Atlantic Coast Conference. They finished the season 14–16, 3–13 in ACC play in thirteenth place. They lost in the first round of the ACC women's tournament to Virginia.

Previous season
They finished the season 7–23, 2–14 in ACC play to finish in fourteenth place. They lost in the first round of the ACC women's tournament to North Carolina. On March 1 after the 2017–18 season, head coach Erik Johnson resigned. He finished at Boston College with a six-year record of 68–115. On April 10, Boston College hired former Albany head coach Joanna Bernabei-McNamee to be the next head coach of the team.

Off-season

Recruiting Class

Source:

Roster

Schedule

Source:

|-
!colspan=9 style=| Non-conference regular season

|-
!colspan=9 style=| ACC regular season

|-
!colspan=9 style=| ACC Women's Tournament

Rankings

See also
 2018–19 Boston College Eagles men's basketball team

References

Boston College Eagles women's basketball seasons
Boston College
Boston College Eagles women's basketball
Boston College Eagles women's basketball
Boston College Eagles women's basketball
Boston College Eagles women's basketball